Julie Pullin (born 5 November 1975), now Julie Hobbs, is a retired British tennis player who turned professional in 1993. She won eight singles titles and 25 doubles titles on the ITF circuit, many with compatriot Lorna Woodroffe. She is most well known for receiving nine wild cards over her career for the ladies' singles at Wimbledon, but failing to win a match.

She reached her career-high WTA singles ranking of 125 in April 2000, after she achieved her best performance in a Grand Slam championship, qualifying and reaching the second round of the Australian Open for the first time. Pullin had defeated Slovak 15th seed Martina Suchá in the first round of qualifying 6–4, 7–5, Gloria Pizzichini 6–4, 6–0 in the second and American Samantha Reeves in the final round 6–2, 7–6. She defeated another American, Jane Chi, 6–1, 6–3 in the first round proper, before narrowly losing to Chinese wild card Yi Jing-Qian, 3–6, 6–2, 7–9. It was the only tournament where Pullin won a main-draw Grand Slam match in singles.

She reached the second round of the Wimbledon ladies' doubles tournament once in 2000, with Woodroffe, beating Dawn Buth and Julie Scott 6–4, 6–1, before losing to the 14th seeded Anke Huber and Barbara Schett in the second round.

Julie Pullin announced her retirement in 2003, after playing her last professional singles match in the first round at Wimbledon, losing 1–6, 3–6 to Lina Krasnoroutskaya.

Personal life
Pullin was born in Cuckfield in Sussex to her father Alan and her tennis coach mother Andrea. She has two brothers, Roger and Keith, and a sister, Vicki. She was coached during her career by Leighton Alfred.

Her married name is now Hobbs, and under that name she is now the head coach at the Pavilion and Avenue Tennis Club in Brighton.

WTA career finals

Doubles: 1 (0–1)

ITF finals

Singles: 18 (8–10)

Doubles: 46 (27–19)

References

External links
 
 

British female tennis players
Tennis players at the 2000 Summer Olympics
1975 births
Living people
Olympic tennis players of Great Britain
English female tennis players